Lagkadia (or ; alternate names or transliterations: Lagadia, Langadia, Langadhia, Lunguntsa) is a village located in Greece. It is only a few kilometres from the border of Greece - North Macedonia.

Notable people
 Constantin Noe (1883–1939), Megleno-Romanian editor and professor in Romania

References

Villages in Greece
Megleno-Romanian settlements